Victor Pylypovych Linetsky (31 January 1901 – Yekaterinodar, Kuban Region, Southern Russia – 19xx    Lviv, Ukraine) was a Russian petroleum hydrogeologist. He criticized physical backgrounds of the hypothesis of “primary” migration from “source” rocks to reservoirs and so-called long-distance migration. Developed the model of vertical migration of the abiotic oil from the great depth to its accumulations in the upper crust. Described how seismic shock is transformed into the hydraulic impact within fluid-saturated fault zone.

He was through with his gymnasium in 1918 and graduated from Leningrad Mining Institute in 1930 as mining petroleum engineer. After graduation, he worked for LenGas, GIProVod and People’s Commissariat of NarkomZem. During World War II he was evacuated and worked in Kazakhstan. After the war he was with HydroEnergyProject Institute (Moscow), than he joined WodGeo in Kharkiv and later worked for UkrHydroEnergyProject Institute in Lviv.
His PhD thesis in Engineering “Technique to study sagging of loess-like rocks” was defended at Kharkiv University in 1945.

The crucial point of his career was 1948 when he joined the Lviv Branch of the Institute of Geological Sciences headed by Professor Vladimir Porfiriev. Since 1953 Linetsky led the Hydrogeology and Engineering Department of the Institute later renamed to Oil and Gas Migration Dept. he defended  his Dr.Sc. dissertation “Physical principles of oil migration” in 1959 at the USSR Academy of Science Oil Institute (Moscow) and became a professor in 1967. He published about 50 research papers including 5 monographs.

Selected publications

Linetsky V.F., 1957. Oil migration and oil reservoirs in the Deep Folds Zone of the Soviet Carpathian Mountains. – Kiev, Ukrainian SSR Ac. Sci. Publ. – 211 p. (in Russian)
Linetsky V.F., 1964. About hypotheses of dispersed oil migration in the form of solution in water. In: Problem of Ukraine’s petroleum potential. – Kiev, Naukov Dumka Publ. – p. 9-19 . (in Russian)
Linetsky V.F., 1965. Migration of oil and formation of its accumulations. – Kiev, Naukova Dumka Publ. – 200 p. (in Russian)
Linetsky V.F., 1966. To the issue of long-distance oil migration. In: Problems of oil origin. – Kiev, Naukov Dumka Publ. – p. 223-231 (in Russian)
Linetsky V.F., 1971. Free space (reaction volume) in the deep fault zone. In: Origin of oil and gas and formation of their commercial accumulations. – Kiev, Naukova Dumka Publ. – p. 143-148 (in Russian)
Linetsky V.F., 1974. Criteria to evaluate permeability of deep faults. Geology and Geochemistry of Combustible Minerals Jour., Vol. 39. – p. 3-9 (in Russian)

See also

 Abiogenic petroleum origin
Institute of Geology and Geochemistry of Combustible Minerals, NASU, Lviv

Soviet geologists
1901 births
Year of death missing